The 1998–99 New Jersey Devils season was the 25th season for the National Hockey League franchise that was established on June 11, 1974, and 17th season since the franchise relocated from Colorado prior to the 1982–83 NHL season. Despite winning the Atlantic Division and being the top seed in the Eastern Conference, the Devils were eliminated in the first round of the playoffs. The Devils' 28 regular-season road wins were the most in the NHL.

Regular season

Season standings

Schedule and results

Playoffs
''note that teams in bold were the winner of the game. Scores are listed winner-loser style, not away-home style

Eastern Conference Quarterfinals

The Devils opened the 1999 playoffs against the Pittsburgh Penguins having only reached the second round of the playoffs once in the three years following its 1995 Cup win. They appeared to be on their way to a series victory against the Penguins when they led Game 6 late; but Pittsburgh's Jaromir Jagr, silent all series to that point, scored with two minutes to go in the third to send the game to overtime and later scored the overtime winner to ensure a seventh game . The Devils never recovered, never once leading in Game 7 before eventually losing 4–2 .

Player stats

Regular season
Scoring

Goaltending

Playoffs
Scoring

Goaltending

Note: GP = Games played; G = Goals; A = Assists; Pts = Points; +/- = Plus/minus; PIM = Penalty minutes; PPG = Power-play goals; SHG = Short-handed goals; GWG = Game-winning goals
      MIN = Minutes played; W = Wins; L = Losses; T = Ties; GA = Goals against; GAA = Goals against average; SO = Shutouts; SA = Shots against; SV = Shots saved; SV% = Save percentage;

Awards and records

Draft picks
The Devils' draft picks at the 1998 NHL Entry Draft at the Marine Midland Arena in Buffalo, New York.

See also
1998–99 NHL season

Notes

References

Bibliography
 
 

New Jersey Devils seasons
New Jersey Devils
New Jersey Devils
New Jersey Devils
New Jersey Devils
20th century in East Rutherford, New Jersey
Meadowlands Sports Complex